The 2015 Mackay Cutters season was the eighth in the club's history. Coached by Kim Williams and captained by Chris Gesch and Liam Taylor, they competed in the QRL's Intrust Super Cup. The club missed the finals for the second consecutive season, finishing 8th.

Season summary
Looking to return to the finals after missing out in 2014, the Cutters recruited former NRL and Super League forward Steve Rapira, who had previously played for the  club in 2009 while contracted to the North Queensland Cowboys, Samoan international Michael Sio and former Brisbane Broncos NRL squad member Cameron Cullen.

The season started strongly for the club, as they went on a five-game winning streak, winning five of their first seven games. The period between their two byes was poor for the side, winning just four of their nine games. On 10 June, it was announced that Kim Williams would be leaving the club at the end of the season to coach the Central Queensland Capras. Seven days later, key off-season recruit Michel Sio left the club, signing with Super League side, Wakefield Trinity. The Cutters ended the year winning one and drawing one of their last seven to finish the season in 8th.

On 9 September, Cowboys-contracted player Josh Chudleigh was named at hooker in the Queensland Cup Team of the Year.

Squad List

2015 squad

Squad movement

Gains

Losses

Fixtures

Regular season

Statistics

Honours

League
Hooker of the Year: Josh Chudleigh

References

2015 in Australian rugby league
2015 in rugby league by club
Mackay Cutters